Dr. Sigué Nouhoun or Nouhoun Sigué (June 1, 1911 – October 1, 2004) was a veterinarian and politician from Burkina Faso who served in the French Senate from 1948 to 1952. He was born in Ouahigouya, Burkina Faso.

References

External links
 Nouhoum Sigué page on the French Senate website

1911 births
2004 deaths
French Senators of the Fourth Republic
Burkinabé politicians
People from Nord Region (Burkina Faso)
Male veterinarians
Veterinarians from Africa
Senators of French West Africa
21st-century Burkinabé people